Hymenoxys insignis is a Mexican species of flowering plant in the daisy family. It has been found in Coahuila, Nuevo León, and Chihuahua in northern Mexico.

References

External links
Photo of herbarium specimen collected in Nuevo León in 1995

insignis
Flora of Mexico
Plants described in 1883